Ivan Fiolić (born 29 April 1996) is a Croatian footballer playing for Osijek as an attacking midfielder.

Club career
Fiolić is a youth exponent from Dinamo Zagreb. He made his Prva HNL debut on 10 May 2014 against NK Istra 1961 in a 2-1 away defeat. Under the tutelage of Zoran Mamić, Fiolić made seven first team appearances in the 2014-15 season.

Fiolić was loaned to Dinamo's affiliate Lokomotiva to gain further experience. In the 2015-16 season at Lokomotiva, Fiolić made 35 appearances in all competitions, scoring eight goals and becoming the club's captain. In the 2016-17 season, he was a major part of Lokomotiva reaching the playoff stage of the Europa League qualifying for the first time in its history as he scored three times in seven matches. By the end of August 2016, Fiolić had made 14 appearances for Lokomotiva in the new season, scoring four goals. 

On 29 August 2016, Fiolić's loan ended and he returned to Dinamo Zagreb.

In 2018 Fiolić signed for Genk.

Career statistics

Club

References

1996 births
Living people
Footballers from Zagreb
Association football midfielders
Croatian footballers
GNK Dinamo Zagreb players
GNK Dinamo Zagreb II players
NK Lokomotiva Zagreb players
K.R.C. Genk players
AEK Larnaca FC players
MKS Cracovia (football) players
NK Osijek players
Croatian Football League players
Belgian Pro League players
Cypriot First Division players
Ekstraklasa players
Croatian expatriate footballers
Expatriate footballers in Belgium
Croatian expatriate sportspeople in Belgium
Expatriate footballers in Cyprus
Croatian expatriate sportspeople in Cyprus
Expatriate footballers in Poland
Croatian expatriate sportspeople in Poland